Ralph Seymour (born May 4, 1956) is an American film, stage, and television actor. He began his career in theater, starring on Broadway in a production of Peter Shaffer's Equus. His early film credits include Underground Aces, Longshot, Back Roads, Just Before Dawn (all 1981). Seymour also had supporting roles in Killer Party (1986), Empire of the Sun (1987), and Rain Man (1988).

Biography
Seymour was born in Lansing, Illinois, the third of five children. He graduated from Thornton Fractional South High School in Lansing in 1974, and was active performing in school plays and community theater.

Seymour relocated to New York City, where he appeared on Broadway as Alan Strang in a production of Peter Shaffer's Equus between 1976 and 1977.

He appeared in the short-lived sitcom Makin' It (1979) before making his film debut in Underground Aces (1981). Next, he co-starred with Leif Garrett and Linda Manz in the television film Longshot (1981), about a group of teenage foosball players.

Seymour subsequently appeared in the comedy Back Roads (1981) with Sally Field and Tommy Lee Jones, and had roles in the slasher film Just Before Dawn (also 1981) and the comedies Surf II (1983) and Meatballs Part II (1984).

Other film roles include in the horror-comedies Ghoulies (1985) and Killer Party (1986), the drama Empire of the Sun (1987), and the comedy-drama Rain Man (1988).

Filmography

Film

Select television

References

External links

Living people
1956 births
Actors from Illinois
American film actors
American male stage actors
American male television actors
People from Lansing, Illinois
20th-century American male actors